Mississippi Industrial College was a historically black college in Holly Springs, Mississippi. It was founded in 1905 by the Mississippi Conference of the Colored Methodist Episcopal Church. After desegregation of community colleges in the mid-20th century, it had trouble competing and eventually closed in 1982. The campus was listed as a historic site on the National Register of Historic Places in 1980 and was acquired by Rust College in 2008.

History
Intended to train students for agriculture and trades, the school was located on a  campus. The Mississippi Conference of the Colored Methodist Episcopal Church founded it in 1905. In January 1906 the first academic session began. Two hundred students were enrolled by May 1906.  By 1908 the school had 450 students.

By 1912 the college was running an extension program to allow students who didn't have time to attend its regular programs to benefit from the education it provided.  According to the Times-Picayune, then president D. C. Potts told a meeting of the Mississippi Colored Methodist Conference in reference to this that "an institution [MIC] for which the people were sacrificing ought to be able to help more than the few students who attended its session."

After the desegregation of Mississippi community colleges, many students chose to go to other schools.  In addition, student expectations were changing. In 1982 the campus closed.

In November 1999 the Mississippi Industrial College Alumni Association, Inc. (MICAAI) was organized in order to preserve the campus and buildings, which had been listed on the National Register of Historic Places in 1980. The University of Mississippi said "the campus now lies in disrepair." In 2008 Rust College acquired the defunct institution's campus.

Notable faculty and alumni

 James Holmes Teer, (1862–1938), college's Board of Trustees, as Treasurer 
 Elias Cottrell, born into slavery(1853–1937), college's founder, 7th Bishop of the CME Church, Elected, 1894.
 Paul A. G. Stewart, '61, 50th Bishop of the CME Church, Elected, 1998.
 Jim Thomas – Canadian Football League All-Star, '63
 Oree Broomfield '53, 45th Bishop of the CME Church, Elected 1982.
 C. D. Coleman, '47, 36th Bishop of the CME Church, Elected, 1974.
 Dr. J. Y. Trice, '46, Minister, Presiding Elder, CME Church, Mayor, City of Rosedale, MS (1985-2001)
 Lawrence Autry, '52, and Irwin Whitaker, '63, First Black elected Superintendent of Education, Marshall and Leflore County
 Charles Jones, '67, and Charles Robinson, '68, served as Superintendent of Education in Arkansas School Districts.
 Earl Glass, '63, NCAA, nation's basketball leading scorer in 1962-63, 42.9 per game. 5th leading scorer in NCAA history.
 First Black Mayors – Viola Foster, '56, Plantersville, Frank Jones, '63, Oakland, MS & Dr. Jessie Edwards,'75, Coldwater, MS,    town's library named in his honor, elected alderman 1981-85, elected mayor of the town from 1989-2001, 2005-13 & 2017-21.
 Dr. Lacey Reynolds, '74, Basketball Coach, MIC, Lemoyne-Owen College, Grambling, Texas Southern (TSU), Prof. of P.E., TSU.
 Lafayette Stribling, '57, Mississippi High School Activities Association Hall of Fame, and SWAC Hall of Fame Basketball coach
 Robert Ledbetter,'60, Football Coach (HS), Norfolk State University, New Orleans Saints, New York Giants, New York Jets.
 Paul Holly, '59, educator, ABA, NBA Basketball Official, Collegiate Football and Basketball Official.
 Dr. E. E. Rankin, '36, President MIC, 1957-78.
 W. M. Frazier, President, MIC, 1933-55.
 Dr. Elbert B. White,'65, Associate Dean of Undergraduate Studies, and Associate Professor of Engineering at George Mason University.
 Osborne Bell, '63, First Black elected Sheriff of Marshall County since Reconstruction.
 Jesse Townsend, '57, drafted by the Kansas City Monarchs of the Negro leagues in 1957. Once struck out twenty-four batters in one game.
 Dr. Fred Pinson, MD,'1910, Dr. Ansell R. Russell, MD,'1911, and Dr. Dr. S. N. Sisson, MD,'1917 (7).
 Mary Callaway, '1912, M. A., English, Stanford University, 1916. Thesis, "Timon of Athens in the Elizabethan Drama" <8> Cubberley Library, Stanford University Press, Catalogue of Graduate Students Pg. 58, 1916.
William M. Henley, '57, Educator (Mathematics, Physics, & Chemistry), Alderman Holy Springs, Ms. High School basketball and football coach. History of Mississippi Industrial College

References

7. Dr. Jessie J. Edwards, '75, Mississippi Industrial College

External links

 Mississippi Industrial College(Archive) University of Mississippi.

 
Defunct private universities and colleges in Mississippi
Education in Marshall County, Mississippi
1905 establishments in Mississippi
Educational institutions established in 1905
1982 disestablishments in Mississippi
Historically black universities and colleges in the United States
Historic districts on the National Register of Historic Places in Mississippi
National Register of Historic Places in Marshall County, Mississippi
Rust College